Claude Drouin  (born May 26, 1956) is a former Canadian politician. He was the Member of Parliament representing the riding of Beauce from 1997 to 2006 and was also the Parliamentary Secretary to Prime Minister Paul Martin with special emphasis on Rural Communities.

Born in Frampton, Quebec, Canada, Drouin is a former foreman and political advisor. He was elected as an MP for the riding of Beauce as a candidate for the Liberal Party of Canada in the 1997 election. He is a former member of the Canadian Air Force.

External links
How'd They Vote?: Claude Drouin's voting history and quotes

1956 births
Living people
Members of the 26th Canadian Ministry
Members of the House of Commons of Canada from Quebec
Liberal Party of Canada MPs
Members of the King's Privy Council for Canada
People from Beauce, Quebec